This is a list of places on the Victorian Heritage Register in the Rural City of Mildura in Victoria, Australia. The Victorian Heritage Register is maintained by the Heritage Council of Victoria.

The Victorian Heritage Register, as of 2020, lists the following 14 state-registered places within the Rural City of Mildura:

References

Mildura
Rural City of Mildura